321 North Clark at Riverfront Plaza is a 35-story,  skyscraper constructed from 1983 to 1987 in Chicago, Illinois. The tower was built by BCE Development Properties and designed by Skidmore, Owings & Merrill as part of the Riverfront Plaza development on the north bank of the Chicago River.

321 North Clark opened in April 1987 and was named "city development of the year" by the Chicago Sun-Times. The building was originally named Quaker Tower after its anchor tenant, the Quaker Oats Company. Quaker moved to a new headquarters in 2002. Currently 321 North Clark is owned by Hines Interests Limited Partnership and houses the headquarters of the American Bar Association, Hummer Mower Associates, among other tenants.

See also
List of tallest buildings in Chicago

References

Sources
321 North Clark at Riverfront Plaza official website
321 North Clark at Riverfront Plaza at Hines Interests Limited Partnership
Chicago Architecture

Hines Interests Limited Partnership
Skyscraper office buildings in Chicago
Office buildings completed in 1987
Skidmore, Owings & Merrill buildings
Leadership in Energy and Environmental Design gold certified buildings
1987 establishments in Illinois